3120 may refer to:

In general
 A.D. 3120, a year in the 4th millennium CE
 3120 BC, a year in the 4th millennium BCE
 3120, a number in the 3000 (number) range

Places
 3120 Dangrania, an asteroid in the Asteroid Belt, the 3120th asteroid registered
 Hawaii Route 3120, a state highway
 Louisiana Highway 3120, a state highway
 Texas Farm to Market Road 3120, a state highway

Other uses
 Nokia 3120, a cellphone
 GAZ 3120, a Russian SUV; see List of GAZ vehicles

See also